Geared Up is a television program on MOJO HD (formerly INHD) that showcases the latest in personal technology in 1080i.  It is very similar to a former TechTV production called Fresh Gear.  Its hosts are Emery Wells, Janna Robinson, and Steven Smith.

External links
 Geared Up's Official Website

American documentary television series